Pleurocera canaliculata is a species of a freshwater snail with a gill and an operculum, an aquatic gastropod mollusk in the family Pleuroceridae, the hornsnails.

Ecology 
Parasites of Pleurocera canaliculata include trematodes Cotylaspis cokeri and Cotylogaster occidentalis.

References

External links

 http://www.fwgna.org/species/pleuroceridae/p_canaliculata.html

Pleuroceridae
Gastropods described in 1821